The 1973 Bucknell Bison football team was an American football team that represented Bucknell University as an independent during the 1973 NCAA Division II football season.

In their fifth year under head coach Fred Prender, the Bison compiled a 3–4–2 record. John Dailey and Carl Probst were the team captains.

Bucknell played its home games at Memorial Stadium on the university campus in Lewisburg, Pennsylvania.

Schedule

References

Bucknell
Bucknell Bison football seasons
Bucknell Bison football